Mawangdui is an archaeological site located in Changsha, China.

Mawangdui may also refer to:

 Mawangdui Subdistrict, a subdistrict in Changsha, China.
 Mawangdui Silk Texts, Chinese philosophical and medical works written on silk